Qayakənd (also, Kayakend) is a village and municipality in the Qusar Rayon of Azerbaijan.  It has a population of 460.

References 

Populated places in Qusar District